At least two ships of the French Navy have been named Languedoc:

 , a  launched in 1766, renamed Anti-fédéraliste and then Victore she was broken up in 1799.
 , an  launched in 2014.

French Navy ship names